Ryazanka is a rural locality (a village) in Kalininskoye Rural Settlement, Totemsky  District, Vologda Oblast, Russia. The population was 32 as of 2002.

Geography 
Ryazanka is located 39 km southwest of Totma (the district's administrative centre) by road. Selo is the nearest rural locality.

References 

Rural localities in Tarnogsky District